The name USS Sacramento has been borne by three ships in the United States Navy. The first was named for the Sacramento River, the second for the Sacramento, California and the third for both.

 The first  was a sloop, launched in 1862 and wrecked in 1867.
 The second  was a gunboat, commissioned in 1914 and decommissioned in 1946.
 The third  was the lead ship of s, commissioned in 1964 and decommissioned in 2004.

United States Navy ship names